William Thornton (died 1707) was Principal of Hart Hall, later Hertford College, Oxford, from 1688 until his death in 1707.

Background
William Thornton was the son of William Thornton of Milborne Port in Somerset. He was educated at Sherborne, and Wadham College, Oxford of which he became a Fellow in 1667 and Sub-Warden in 1676.

References

17th-century births

1707 deaths
Year of birth missing
Alumni of Wadham College, Oxford
People from West Somerset (district)
People educated at Sherborne School
People from Somerset
Principals of Hart Hall, Oxford